The 2010 Belgian Cup Final, named Cofidis Cup after the sponsor, was played on 15 May 2010 between Gent and Cercle Brugge. It was the 55th Belgian Cup final.

Road to the Final

 Both clubs received a bye to round six.
 In square brackets is a letter that represents the opposition's division
 [D1] = Belgian First Division
 [D2] = Belgian Second Division
 [D3] = Belgian Third Division

Match details

MATCH RULES
90 minutes.
30 minutes of extra-time if necessary.
Penalty shoot-out if scores still level.
Maximum 7 named substitutes
Maximum of 3 substitutions.

See also
2009–10 Belgian Cup

References

Cup
2010
K.A.A. Gent matches
Cercle Brugge K.S.V. matches
May 2010 sports events in Europe
2010 in Brussels
Sports competitions in Brussels